Chacha Chaudhar may refer to:

 Chacha Chaudhary, an Indian comic book character
 Chacha Chaudhary (2002 TV series)
 Chacha Chaudhary (2019 TV series)